The 2022 AFC Cup qualifying play-offs were played from 5 to 19 April 2022. A total of ten teams competed in the qualifying play-offs to decide three of the 39 places in the group stage of the 2022 AFC Cup.

Teams
The following 10 teams, split into five zones (West Asia Zone, Central Asia Zone, South Asia Zone, ASEAN Zone, East Asia Zone), entered the qualifying play-offs, consisting of three rounds:
4 teams entered in the preliminary round 1.
2 teams entered in the preliminary round 2.
4 teams entered in the play-off.

Format

In the qualifying play-offs, each tie was played as a single match. Extra time and penalty shoot-out were used to decide the winner if necessary.

Schedule
The schedule of each round was as follows.

Bracket

The bracket of the qualifying play-offs for each zone was determined based on each team's association ranking, with the team from the higher-ranked association hosting the match. The three winners of the play-off round advanced to the group stage to join the 36 direct entrants.

South Asia play-off
 ATK Mohun Bagan advanced to Group D.

ASEAN play-off
 Visakha FC advanced to Group G and  Young Elephants advanced to Group I.

East Asia play-off
 Lee Man advanced to Group J.

Preliminary round 1

Summary
A total of four teams played in the preliminary round 1.

|+South Asia Zone

South Asia Zone

Preliminary round 2

Summary
A total of four teams played in the preliminary round 2: two teams which entered in this round, and two winners of the preliminary round 1.

|+South Asia Zone

South Asia Zone

Play-off round

Summary
A total of six teams played in the play-off round: four teams which entered in this round, and two winners of the preliminary round 2.

|+South Asia Zone

|+ASEAN Zone

|+East Zone

South Asia Zone

ASEAN Zone

East Asia Zone

Notes

References

External links

1
April 2022 sports events in Asia